Eva-Maria Schneider (born Eva-Maria Schürhoff; 8 December 1969) is a German former professional tennis player.

Schürhoff, who grew up in Gummersbach, reached a best singles ranking of 235 in the world as a professional player, most notably qualifying for the main draw of the 1990 Australian Open.

While studying medicine at the University of Cologne she was a two-time Universiade bronze medalist for Germany in doubles. She also played college tennis for the University of Arizona as a transfer student.

ITF finals

Singles: 7 (5–2)

Doubles: 7 (5–2)

References

External links
 
 

1969 births
Living people
West German female tennis players
German female tennis players
Arizona Wildcats women's tennis players
Universiade bronze medalists for Germany
Universiade medalists in tennis
University of Cologne alumni
People from Gummersbach
Sportspeople from Cologne (region)
Tennis people from North Rhine-Westphalia